Iftikhar Khan was the Mughal Governor of Kashmir from 1671 to 1675.

Sources
Patwant Singh. The Sikhs (New York: Alfred A. Knopf, 2000) p. 45.

Governors of Jammu and Kashmir
17th-century politicians
17th-century Indian politicians